Joseph or Joe Thomson is the name of:

J. J. Thomson (1856–1940), physicist
Joseph Thomson (cricketer) (1877-1953), Australian cricketer
Joseph Thomson (explorer) (1858–1895), African explorer
Joseph Angus Thomson (1856–1943), Australian politician
Joe Thomson (1948–2018), academic
Joe Thomson (footballer) (born 1997), Scottish footballer with Celtic

See also
Joseph Thompson (disambiguation)